Edward J. Ward (born November 10, 1969) is a Canadian former professional ice hockey player. Ward played 278 games for five teams.

Playing career
Ward was drafted by the Quebec Nordiques in the sixth round, 108th overall in the 1988 NHL Entry Draft. Ward chose to play NCAA hockey for Northern Michigan University before turning pro. He helped lead NMU to the 1991 NCAA title. In 1991, he began his pro career with the Greensboro Monarchs of the East Coast Hockey League, eventually cracking the Nordiques roster in 1993–94. Ward played only seven games with the Nords before being sent to the Calgary Flames. Ward spent five years bouncing between the Flames, and their AHL affiliate the Saint John Flames, then played parts of seasons with the Atlanta Thrashers, Mighty Ducks of Anaheim and the New Jersey Devils. Ward finished his career in Sweden, playing one season with Timrå IK in 2001–02 before retiring.

Career statistics

Regular season and playoffs

External links

1969 births
Living people
Albany River Rats players
Atlanta Thrashers players
Calgary Flames players
Canadian ice hockey right wingers
Cornwall Aces players
Detroit Vipers players
Greensboro Monarchs players
Halifax Citadels players
Ice hockey people from Edmonton
Mighty Ducks of Anaheim players
New Jersey Devils players
Northern Michigan Wildcats men's ice hockey players
Quebec Nordiques draft picks
Quebec Nordiques players
Saint John Flames players
Timrå IK players
Canadian expatriate ice hockey players in Sweden
NCAA men's ice hockey national champions